Theodor Friedrich Wilhelm Christian Kaulbach (8 July 1822 – 17 September 1903) was a German painter from Bad Arolsen, Principality of Waldeck and Pyrmont. His father was Christian Kaulbach (1777–1847), a cabinet maker in Arolsen.  He was also the cousin and at one time the student of the painter Wilhelm von Kaulbach, son of Philipp Karl Friedrich v. Kaulbach (1775–1846), goldsmith and amateur painter.

Early years

After a visit to Venice in 1844, he and his uncle parted ways.  He painted independently until 1848, when he executed the painting Adam and Eve beside the body of Abel.  This led to a call to a professorship at the Academy of Fine Arts, Munich, which he declined.

In 1850 he traveled to Paris, where he produced historical paintings, and supported himself through portraiture.  In 1850, Maximilian II of Bavaria commissioned him to paint the Coronation of Charlemagne for the Museum Maximilianeum.  The picture was completed in 1861.

Establishment as court painter in Hanover
 
Kaulbach served as the court painter to King George V, whom he repeatedly portrayed, where he was a favorite portrait painter of the local nobility.  While he was the court painter to Hanover, he received a professorship at the Technical University. Among other benefits, the king gave him his own studio and residential building, designed by the architect Christian Heinrich Tramm (1857–60) on Waterloo Street in Hanover.  The house today is part of the Waterloo Beergarden.   In her memoirs, his daughter  described the visitors to the family home, who included  Johannes Brahms, Clara Schumann, Franz Liszt, Joseph Joachim, Ernst von Wildenbruch and Anton Rubinstein.
 
His numerous portraits, such as those of  Empress Elisabeth, Crown Prince Albrecht, and the Count and Countess Stolberg, are extraordinarily detailed, even luminescent. His best women's portraits enhanced his reputation. Kaulbach received the Gold Medal from the  Berlin Art Academy at the 1873 Vienna World's Fair.

Kaulbach's sons, Friedrich August, Anton and Sigmund (1854-1894) were also painters.

Prominent works
Adam and Eve by Abel's Body (1848, Museum für Bildende Künste, Leipzig)
Elisabeth Nay (1860; Niedersächsisches Landesmuseum)
Coronation of Charlemagne (1861, Maximilaneum, München)
Juliet Capulet’s Wedding Morning (1862–1903; Niedersächsisches Landesmuseum, Hannover)
Blind King George V (c. 1866; Hannover, Niedersachs. Landesmuseum)

References
Isidore Kaulbach, Friedrich Kaulbach.  Memories of my father's home.  Berlin: 1931.
Henning Rischbieter: Hannoversches Lesebuch or: What in Hanover, and Hanover written, printed and read the paper.  Volume 2: 1850-1950.  2nd  Ed Hanover: Schlueter 1991, p. 102-105 (with excerpts from Isidore Kaulbachs memories). 
 Hugo Thielen, Hannoverian biographical dictionary.  From its beginnings to the present day.  Hanover: Schlueter 2002, p. 195.

External links

1822 births
1903 deaths
People from Bad Arolsen
People from the Principality of Waldeck and Pyrmont
19th-century German painters
19th-century German male artists
German male painters
Court painters
Munich School
Von Kaulbach family